Krasnoye is a rural locality (a selo) and the administrative center of Krasnoselskoye Rural Settlement, Yuryev-Polsky District, Vladimir Oblast, Russia. The population was 605 as of 2010.

Geography 
Krasnoye is located 4 km north of Yuryev-Polsky (the district's administrative centre) by road. Yuryev-Polsky is the nearest rural locality.

References 

Rural localities in Yuryev-Polsky District